Eduardo Antonio Guerrero Lozcano (born 21 February 2000) is a Panamanian footballer who plays as a forward for Ukrainian club Zorya Luhansk, on loan from Maccabi Tel Aviv and the Panama national team.

Club career
On 3 September 2018, Guerrero joined Israeli Premier League side Maccabi Tel Aviv on a season-long loan deal with the option to make the deal permanent, playing for the club's U19 squad.

Maccabi Tel Aviv exercised the option to buy on 17 July 2019.

International career
Guerrero made his international debut for Panama on 24 October 2017 during a friendly match against Grenada.

Career statistics

Club

International

References

External links

 Maccabi Tel Aviv profile
 
 

2000 births
Living people
Panamanian footballers
Sportspeople from Panama City
Association football midfielders
Unión Deportivo Universitario players
Maccabi Tel Aviv F.C. players
Beitar Tel Aviv Bat Yam F.C. players
Hapoel Jerusalem F.C. players
Beitar Jerusalem F.C. players
FC Zorya Luhansk players
Liga Panameña de Fútbol players
Israeli Premier League players
Ukrainian Premier League players
Liga Leumit players
Panama international footballers
Panama under-20 international footballers
Panama youth international footballers
Panamanian expatriate footballers
Expatriate footballers in Israel
Expatriate footballers in Ukraine
Panamanian expatriate sportspeople in Israel
Panamanian expatriate sportspeople in Ukraine